Three ships of the United States Navy have borne the name USS Du Pont, in honor of Rear Admiral Samuel Francis Du Pont.

United States Navy ship names